Salinerito is an Ecuadorian brand that represents cooperative companies from the Andean mountain village Salinas de Guaranda in the province of Bolívar. Salinerito is perhaps best known for its cheeses and chocolates, and also sells dried mushrooms, fruits, nougats, marmalade, lamb and alpaca wool textiles, and yarn. The products are sold in Ecuador at local grocery stores and exported for example to Japan and Italy.

Salinerito is known for its model of solidarity economy: The profits are used for improving the business or for social development.

The legal owner of the brand is Gruppo Salinas, the umbrella organization that represents the common interests of the people of Salinas and its seven member institutions. Gruppo Salinas is a member of the WFTO.

Gruppo Salinas 
Gruppo Salinas Corporation gather many organisations which are:
COOPSALINAS (Cooperativa de Ahorro y Crédito Salinas): legally constituted in November 16, 1972 as a saving and credit cooperative, it was the basis for the creation of the following organizations.
PRODUCOOP (Cooperativa de Producción Agropecuaria El Salinerito): this cooperative is in charge of the milky derivatives production in 22 villages around it. It has 980 partners which are farmers.
TEXAL (Asociación de Mujeres Artesanas de Salinas):  a women's association who knit crafts to help own social development.
FUGJS (Fundación Grupo Juvenil): this foundations helps Salinas' young people, the main activity is produce and export comestible mushrooms.
FFSS (Fundación Familia Salesiana): works in the areas of health, education as well as pastoral activities.
FUNORSAL (Fundación de Organizaciones Campesinas de Salinas): looks for the welfare of the people of all the communities of Salinas.
FUNCONQUERUCOM (Fundación Consorcio de Queseras Rurales Comunitarias), this organization manages brand's commercial activities into Ecuador

External links

Social economy